Georges Bertin Scott (10 June 1873 – 10 January 1943) was a French war correspondent and illustrator for the French magazine L'Illustration during the early 20th century. His work was part of the painting event in the art competition at the 1928 Summer Olympics. He produced paintings of the Balkan Wars and the First World War, and also covered and illustrated scenes from the Spanish Civil War and the early Second World War. One of his works, an oil painting of his depicting King Constantine I of Greece during the Balkan Wars hangs in main entry hall of the Presidential Palace in Athens. In 1909 Scott married French singer Nelly Martyl, who served as a nurse during the First World War, and was awarded the Croix de Guerre.

Gallery

Further reading
 Buttet, H. de, "Georges Scott (1873-1943)," Revue de la Société des Amis du Musée de l'Armée, No. 69, 1965, pp. 53–57.
 Scott, Georges (1913). Dans les Balkans 1912-1913: récits et visions de guerre / Tableaux et croquis de route rapportés par Georges Scott. Récits de Mme Hélène Leune et de MM. Gustave Cirilli, René Puaux, Gustave Babin, Georges Rémond, capitaine de frégate Nel, Jean Leune, Alain de Penennrun. Paris: Librairie Chapelot.

References

External links

 Biography and list of paintings

1873 births
1943 deaths
French illustrators
19th-century French painters
French male painters
20th-century French painters
20th-century French male artists
World War I artists
20th-century war artists
World War II artists
French war artists
War correspondents of the Balkan Wars
Olympic competitors in art competitions
19th-century French male artists